Ilias Polyzois (born 15 October 1939) is a Greek rower. He competed in the men's coxed four event at the 1960 Summer Olympics.

References

1939 births
Living people
Greek male rowers
Olympic rowers of Greece
Rowers at the 1960 Summer Olympics
Sportspeople from Piraeus